Blues Harp is a 1998 Japanese yakuza film directed by Takashi Miike.

Plot summary
Ambitious yakuza Kenji of the Hanamura gang befriends harmonica-playing bartender Chuji, who also works as a part-time drug-dealer for the opposing Okada gang. Kenji is sleeping with Reiko, the wife of the boss Yukichi Hanamura, and pays a man to forge a will naming Kenji as Yukichi's sole heir. He then makes a deal with Kojima of the Okada gang whereby Kojima will have Yukichi Hanamura killed and then Kenji will have Okada killed in retaliation, thereby allowing Kenji and Kojima to rise to the head of their respective gangs. Tokiko tells Chuji that she is pregnant with his child and a scout from City Records named Mr. Sugiyama offers to sign Chuji. Kenji's bodyguard Kaneko, jealous of Kenji's friendship with Chuji, suggests to the Okadas that they should send the expendable Chuji to kill Yukichi Hanamura and ultimately be shot by a waiting sniper. Reiko replaces Hanamura's will with the forgery and Kojima offers to let Chuji stop dealing drugs and become a professional musician if he kills Hanamura. Kaneko confesses to Kenji that he suggested Chuji to the Okadas so Kaneko rushes to the hotel where Hanamura meets his mistress and is accidentally almost shot by Chuji. Hanamura and his men kill Kojima and shoot at Kenji and Chuji as they are escaping back to the club for Chuji's stage performance for the record executives. Hanamura's men arrive and kill Kenji, then enter the club to get Chuji.

Cast
Mickey Curtis
Daisuke Iijima as Yukichi Hanamura
Hiroyuki Ikeuchi as Chuji Yonashiro
Akira Ishige
Huntley Nicholas as Chuji's black father
Atsushi Okuno
Saori Sekino as Tokiko
Bob Suzuki
Seiichi Tanabe as Kenji Shindo

Other credits
Production Design: Akira Ishige
Assistant Director: Bunmei Katô
Sound Department: Yukiya Sato - sound

Reception
In his 2005 book Outlaw Masters of Japanese Film, author Chris Desjardins writes, "A truly great picture, Blues Harp remains one of Miike's finest, a perfectly realized and emotionally affecting movie."

External links

References

1998 films
Films about bartenders
Films about music and musicians
Films directed by Takashi Miike
Films set in Yokosuka
Yakuza films
1990s Japanese-language films
1990s Japanese films